The Montreal Tapes: with Don Cherry and Ed Blackwell is a live album by the American jazz bassist Charlie Haden with trumpeter Don Cherry and drummer Ed Blackwell recorded at the Montreal International Jazz Festival in 1989 and released on the Verve label.

Reception 
The Allmusic review by Don Snowden awarded the album 4 stars, stating, "this trio lineup – call it either the original Coleman quartet sans Ornette or three-quarters of Old and New Dreams – still springs some surprises".

Track listing 
All compositions by Ornette Coleman except as indicated
 "The Sphinx" – 9:31 
 "Art Deco" (Don Cherry) – 6:24 
 "Happy House" – 8:24 
 "Lonely Woman" – 11:41 
 "Mopti" (Cherry) – 5:29 
 "The Blessing" – 6:01 
 "When Will the Blues Leave?" – 4:04 
 "Law Years" – 6:46 
Recorded at the Festival de Jazz de Montreal in Canada on July 2, 1989

Personnel 
 Charlie Haden – bass
 Don Cherry – pocket trumpet
 Ed Blackwell – drums

References 

Verve Records live albums
Charlie Haden live albums
1994 live albums